Hansanarayan Bhattacharya (1928 - 14 March 2002), a researcher of Sanskrit and Bengali literature, was born in Mirhat (now Baidyapur) village, West Bengal, India.

Life and career
Bhattacharya passed the Master of Arts examination thrice – in Sanskrit, Bengali and history of India with distinction respectively. He completed his doctoral studies from Calcutta University; his research area was in Yatragan. He also studied Sanskrit grammar, kabyo and vedanta. He worked as a professor for nearly 34 years. He was the Dean of the Bengali and Literature department of Nabadwip Vidyasagar College.

Notable works
One of his notable works is Hindu Debdevi- Udvob o Kromovikash (হিন্দুদের দেবদেবী - উদ্ভব ও ক্রমবিকাশ). He has written over 250 article on his research, poems, travelogues and other areas in many journals.

Bhattacharya's work has been documented by the Indian Institute of Science's Digital Library of India. His work has also been widely cited by Bhattacharya's peers and successors.

References

20th-century Indian historians
Indian Sanskrit scholars
Bengali-language literature
1928 births
2002 deaths